New Jersey's 9th congressional district is represented in Congress by Democrat Bill Pascrell, who resides in Paterson. Congressman Pascrell was first elected in 1996 from the old 8th district (prior to the 2010 census), defeating incumbent William J. Martini. The 9th district consists largely of municipalities in Bergen County and Passaic County.

Due to redistricting following the 2010 Census, portions of the old 9th district were shifted to the 5th district and the new 8th district, as part of a reduction in congressional districts from 13 to 12 in New Jersey. The new congressional map resulted in Pascrell's hometown of Paterson being added to the 9th district, which had been represented by Steve Rothman, a fellow Democrat who, like Pascrell, entered Congress after winning a seat in the 1996 election. In 2012, both incumbents ran for their party's nomination for the seat in the June primary, which Pascrell won. Later that year, Pascrell defeated Rabbi Shmuley Boteach, the Republican nominee, in the general election.

Counties and municipalities in the district
For the 118th and successive Congresses (based on redistricting following the 2020 Census), the district contains all or portions of three counties and 35 municipalities.

Bergen County (24):
Carlstadt, Cliffside Park, East Rutherford, Edgewater, Elmwood Park, Fairview, Franklin Lakes, Garfield, Hasbrouck Heights, Little Ferry, Lodi, Lyndhurst, Maywood (part, also 5th), Moonachie, North Arlington, Oakland, Ridgefield, Rochelle Park, Rutherford, Saddle Brook, South Hackensack, Teterboro, Wallington, and Wood-Ridge

Hudson County (2):
Kearny (part, also 8th), Secaucus

Passaic County (9):
Clifton, Haledon, Hawthorne, North Haledon, Passaic, Paterson, Pompton Lakes, Prospect Park, and Wayne (part, also 11th)

Recent statewide election history

List of members representing the district

Recent election results

2012

2014

2016

2018

2020

2022

References

 Congressional Biographical Directory of the United States 1774–present

External links
New Jersey's 9th Congressional District at GovTrack.us

09
Bergen County, New Jersey
Hudson County, New Jersey
Passaic County, New Jersey
Constituencies established in 1903
1903 establishments in New Jersey